Vastari is an online service provider that connects museums, exhibition producers, venues, collectors and suppliers for more efficient exhibitions. Vastari's headquarters are in London, England, with regional representatives in several countries around the world.

Services
Vastari allows private collectors to upload their objects to a secure online database and remain anonymous. Registered and verified museums have access to search through the database for works relevant to future exhibitions.

Art owners can share their art with curators who will research their collections and put the works into art historical context and exhibition programming. "The system includes two search engines: one database of museum object requests for collectors to browse and a search engine of art  objects for museums to consider for exhibition."

Vastari has also built the Touring Exhibition platform "Vastari Exhibitions" (formerly known as VTEN), where museums and other exhibition producers can list and exchange exhibitions with other institutional and private venues around the world.

As of August 2017, Vastari has access to over 400,000 works, and has around 900 museums registered.

Judged by leading technology companies such as Uber, Google, and Virgin StartUp, Vastari was included in the 2017 Disrupt 100 list, an annual Tällt Ventures publication presenting businesses with the most potential to influence, change, or create new global markets.

In July 2021, Vastari launched subsidiary company Vastari Labs in order to help art industry professionals learn to utilise new cutting edge technologies such as non-fungible tokens (NFTs), Cryptoart, Blockchain, Ethereum or Tezos, Smart Contracts, Metaverse and Web3.

INSOLVENCY: In April 2022, Vastari Group Ltd was deemed insolvent. Chief Executive Officer, Bernadine Jorien Karena Brocker Weider, took the decision to place the Company into administration, and Resolve Advisory LLP were appointed administrators on 20 April 2022, with unsecured creditors owed >£250,000.

Funding
Vastari is a privately funded company. They completed the Microsoft Ventures Accelerator Programme. On 5 February 2016, the company announced a major fundraising round from private investors in the tech and art space.

Founders
The company was founded by two art historians - Bernadine Brocker Wieder and Francesca Polo.

References

External links
 Official website

Companies with year of establishment missing
Companies based in the London Borough of Hackney
Online companies of the United Kingdom
Museum companies
Online databases